Segun Adeyina is a Democratic member of the Georgia House of Representatives, elected in 2022 and assuming office on January 9, 2023.

Education 
Adeyina is a graduate of electrical engineering from the University of Akron, Ohio and also achieved a master's degree in management information systems from Lawrence Technology University.

References 

Members of the Georgia House of Representatives
Living people
Year of birth missing (living people)